Juno II was an American space launch vehicle used during the late 1950s and early 1960s. It was derived from the Jupiter missile, which was used as the first stage.

Development 
Solid rocket motors derived from the MGM-29 Sergeant were used as upper stages, eleven for the second stage, three for the third stage, and one for the fourth stage, the same configuration as used for the upper stages of the smaller Juno I launch vehicle. On some launches to low Earth orbit the fourth stage was not flown, allowing the launch vehicle to carry an additional nine kilograms of payload. Development of the Juno II was extremely fast due to being completely built from existing hardware. The project began in early 1958 and the first vehicle flew at the end of the year. Chrysler were responsible for the overall contract, while Rocketdyne handled the first stage propulsion and Jet Propulsion Laboratory handled the upper stage propulsion. The first three were converted Jupiter missiles, however all remaining boosters were built as Juno IIs from the beginning.

The main differences between the Juno II and Jupiter were stretched propellant tanks for increased burn time (the first stage burn time was approximately 20 seconds longer than on the Jupiter), a reinforced structure to support the added weight of upper stages, and the inertial guidance system replaced with a radio ground guidance package, which was moved to the upper stages.

History 
The Juno II was used for ten satellite launches, of which six failed. It launched Pioneer 3, Pioneer 4, Explorer 7, Explorer 8, and Explorer 11 from Cape Canaveral Launch Complex 5 and Launch Complex 26B.

The first launch of a Juno II, Pioneer 3 on 6 December 1958, suffered a premature first stage cutoff, preventing the upper stages from achieving sufficient velocity. Pioneer 3 could not escape Earth orbit, but transmitted data for some 40 hours before reentering the atmosphere. A malfunction in a propellant depletion circuit was found to be the cause of the failure, although the exact nature of it could not be determined. The circuit was redesigned afterwards.

Pioneer 4 launched successfully on 3 March 1959, making for the only first-generation U.S. lunar probe to accomplish all of its mission goals, as well as the sole successful U.S. lunar probe until 1964. After Pioneer 4, NASA shifted their lunar efforts to the bigger Atlas-Able booster and decided instead to utilize the Juno II for Earth orbital launches. By removing the fourth stage, the payload capacity was nearly doubled.

The attempted launch of an Explorer satellite on 16 July 1959 failed dramatically when the Juno II lost control almost immediately at liftoff, performing a cartwheel before the Range safety officer sent the destruct command. The almost fully fueled booster crashed a few hundred feet from the pad, blockhouse crews watching in stunned surprise at the upper stage motors burning on the ground. Cause of the mishap was quickly traced to a short between two diodes in a power inverter, which cut off power to the guidance system at liftoff and caused the Juno's engine to gimbal to full stop, flipping the vehicle onto its side before Range Safety action was taken. To prevent a recurrence of this failure mode, improved coatings were used on the circuit boards in the booster.

On 15 August 1959, the next Juno II was flown, carrying the Beacon satellite. While first stage performance was nominal, the upper stages malfunctioned. One intended experiment on this mission was the ejection of four flares stowed in the interstage section which would be tracked and photographed during the launch. However, things went awry when the flare ejection failed to take place on schedule. The control system also malfunctioned and drove the upper stages into the Atlantic Ocean instead of orbit. It was concluded that one of the flares deployed inside the interstage section instead of outside like it was intended to, causing the guidance compartment to depressurize and cause loss of vehicle control.

Explorer 7 was scheduled for launch in the last week of September 1959, but a Jupiter missile test on an adjacent pad failed just after liftoff on 15 September 1959 and the Juno II suffered minor damage from flying debris. This was quickly repaired and the launch performed successfully on 13 October 1959. Explorer 7 would be the last Juno II launch from LC-5 as the pad was then permanently reassigned to Project Mercury.

On 23 March 1960, another Explorer satellite failed to reach orbit when one second stage motor failed to ignite, causing imbalanced thrust that sent the payload into the Atlantic Ocean.

In mid-1960, with only two successful launches in six attempts, a NASA board conducted a thorough reevaluation of the Juno II as a launch vehicle. The failures were mostly traced to isolated component failures that occurred as a result of inadequate testing and checkouts. This was blamed on the program being close-ended, with no further plans for development of the booster, leading to low interest and apathy among those in the program. The JPL team who developed the Juno II had originally only intended it for the Pioneer lunar probes and their interest started waning as soon as NASA began Earth orbital launches with the vehicle. Even worse, most of the design team had been disbanded and its members reassigned to other projects, making it difficult to obtain technical information for the Juno II. The conversion of the booster for LEO launches also threw off the calibration of the spinning tub third stage which was designed for the tiny Pioneer probes and not the larger Explorer satellites.

At this time, NASA had four Juno IIs remaining in their inventory. The review board predicted that two of them would launch successfully, but recommended that there was no reason not to fly the boosters since they had already been bought and paid for. Their assumptions proved correct.

Explorer 8 was launched successfully on 3 November 1960, with the next attempt on 24 February 1961 a failure. A control cable came loose during ascent and wrapped itself around the spinning third stage tub, damaging the upper stages and payload. Second stage ignition occurred on time, but the third stage did not ignite and the satellite failed to orbit. Explorer 11 launched successfully on 27 April 1961, an event that raised NASA's morale during a mostly disastrous month characterized by Project Mercury failures and the Soviet launch of a man into space. On 24 May 1961, the final Juno II lifted from LC-26A carrying another ionospheric beacon satellite. The instrument unit lost power following first stage separation, resulting in no second stage ignition and the payload reaching the ocean floor instead of orbit. By this time however, the fast-rising Thor-Delta and Agena vehicles were on their way to take over as mainstays of the U.S. light and medium lift launch vehicle arsenal.

Launch history

Specifications 
 Total length: 24.0 m
 Orbit payload to 200 km: 41 kg
 Escape velocity payload: 6 kg
 First launch date: 6 December 1958
 Last launch date: 24 May 1961

See also 

 Juno I
 PGM-19 Jupiter

References

External links 
 Encyclopedia Astronautica - Juno II

Rockets and missiles
Space launch vehicles of the United States